The International Council of Marine Industry Associations (ICOMIA, founded 1966) is a non-profit international trade association that brings together national recreational marine industry associations and represents them at an international level. ICOMIA has currently 35 full members representing virtually all countries with an active recreational marine industry in Europe, North America, Asia and Australia.

ICOMIA publishes documents and guidelines to facilitate the growth of the global recreational marine industry. One of ICOMIA’s on-going projects is the Global Conformity Guidelines, which are produced in association with the American Boat and Yacht Council (ABYC),British Marine Federation (BMF), National Marine Manufacturers Association (NMMA) and International Marine Certification Institute (IMCI).

The purpose of the Global Conformity Guidelines is to assist boat builders who comply with either ABYC or ISO standard systems, but are looking to start exporting to countries using the opposite system. So far, ICOMIA has published seven guidelines including Fuel Systems, Powering and Windows, Portlights and Hatches in the ICOMIA Online Library. The final goal of the Global Conformity Guidelines is to resolve the differences between the two standards and achieve one global technical specification.

Equally important to mention are the annual ICOMIA industry statistics, which are produced annually with numbers from their global membership.

In addition to publishing guidelines and other valuable documents, ICOMIA is directly involved with a number of international events. In partnership with Amsterdam RAI, the annual marine equipment trade show METS has become the global market place for equipment manufacturers.

References

 International Boat Industry (2002). The Yearbook 2002. IPC Country & Leisure Ltd.

 International Boating Business Magazine. Issue 377, February - March 2011. IPC Media.

 Finnboat News. Issue 04, 2011. Published by the Finnish Marine Industry Association Finnboat and produced by Oy Sea-Kari Ab, Helsinki.

 Båtbranschen. Issue 06, 2010. Published by the Swedish Marine Industry Association Sweboat.

 The British Marine Federation 

 Statistics Book 2010 - Boating Business Magazine
 METS a great Success - Boating Business

Boating associations
Organizations established in 1967